The Jiacha Hydropower Station, also named Gacha Hydropower Station,  is the second largest hydropower station built in Tibet, located in Gyaca County on the middle reaches of the Brahmaputra, with a total installed capacity of 360 MW and a designed annual generation capacity of 1.705 billion kWh.

History
Jiacha Hydropower Station was approved by the National Development and Reform Commission in 2015, its official construction started in December. On 11 August 2020, its first unit was put into operation for electricity generation.

The hydroelectric power plant is currently the largest power station in Tibet in terms of single-unit capacity, which is 120,000 kilowatts. 

The project is one of the three hydro dams on the Brahmaputra River, which State Council of China announced in January 2013 as part of its New Energy Development Plan.

See also 

 List of dams on the Brahmaputra River

References 

Brahmaputra River
Dams on the Brahmaputra River
Reservoirs and dams in Tibet
2020 establishments in China
Hydroelectric power stations in Tibet